Thomas Brüchle (born 29 July 1976) is a German para table tennis player who participates in international level events. He is a multiple European medalist, double World champion and double Paralympic silver medalist. He competes mainly in team events along with Thomas Schmidberger, they both share the same team titles.

References

External links
 
 

1976 births
Living people
German male table tennis players
Paralympic table tennis players of Germany
Paralympic medalists in table tennis
Paralympic silver medalists for Germany
Table tennis players at the 2012 Summer Paralympics
Table tennis players at the 2016 Summer Paralympics
Table tennis players at the 2020 Summer Paralympics
Medalists at the 2012 Summer Paralympics
Medalists at the 2016 Summer Paralympics
People from Lindau
Sportspeople from Swabia (Bavaria)